In cricket, a five-wicket haul (also known as a "five-for" or "fifer") refers to a bowler taking five or more wickets in a single innings. This is regarded as a significant achievement. As of July 2022, 161 cricketers have taken a five-wicket haul on their debut in a Test match. Of these, eleven cricketers have taken two five-wicket hauls on their Test debut, including four from England, two each from Australia and Sri Lanka, and one each from India, South Africa, and the West Indies.

English left-arm medium-paced bowler Frederick Martin was the first player to do so; he took 6 wickets for 50 and 6 wickets for 52 on his debut, against Australia in the second Test of the 1890 Ashes series.  The feat was repeated three years later by Tom Richardson who took 5 for 49 and 5 for 107 against Australia in the third Test of the 1893 Ashes series.  Clarrie Grimmett became the first Australian to take two five-wicket hauls on his Test debut, when he took 5 for 45 and 6 for 37 in the fifth Test of the 1924–25 Ashes series at the Sydney Cricket Ground.  Charles Marriott was the third England player to take a pair of fifers on his Test debut, against the West Indies on their 1933 tour of England.  Despite his bowling performance, Marriott never played Test cricket again.

Ken Farnes took two five-wicket hauls on his debut against Australia in the first Test of the 1934 Ashes series but still ended on the losing side.  In 1948, West Indian right-arm fast bowler Hines Johnson was the first cricketer outside an Ashes tournament to take two fifers on his Test debut when he took 5 for 41 and 5 for 55 against England at Sabina Park during England's 1947–48 tour.  South African medium-fast bowler Sydney Burke became the seventh player to take a pair of five-wicket hauls on Test debut, with a total of eleven wickets in the third Test of New Zealand tour of 1961–62.

Narendra Hirwani recorded the best match-figures by any bowler on Test debut. He took 8 for 61 and 8 for 75 against West Indies in 1987–88 Test series. As of July 2022, Sri Lanka's spin bowler Prabath Jayasuriya is the most recent cricketer to take two five-wicket hauls on debut. He took 6 for 118 and 6 for 59 against Australia during the second Test of the 2022 series between the teams.

Key

Note: For the bowling figures, the top line is the first innings bowling figures, and the bottom line is the second innings bowling figures.

List of cricketers who have taken two five-wicket hauls on Test debut

Notes

References

External links
Five-wicket hauls at Cricinfo

England
Lists of cricketers who have taken five wickets on Test debut
Test cricket records